Events from the year 1507 in India.

Events
The siege of Cannanore (1507) from April to August

References

See also
 Timeline of Indian history

 
India